The Islamic Azad University, Khomeyni Shahr Branch (Also written Khomeynishahr, Khomeyni-Shahr, Khomeini-Shahr) (IAUKHSH) is a branch of the Islamic Azad University and is located in Khomeyni Shahr, the north western zone of Isfahan, the cultural capital of Iran. It was established 17 May 1988. The university serves more than 9000 students at undergraduate and postgraduate levels. It has 530 full and part-time faculty members carrying out education and research in different fields. Due to its geographical location which borders one of the best state universities of Iran, i.e. Isfahan University of Technology, it has made an astonishing opportunity for the students to study in different areas. The admission to university is based on entrance examination and the admission rate is 10%. With over twenty five years of service, this university is now one of the most prominent centers in Isfahan Province and one of the most distinguished ones in higher education in Iran, and with its precise and professional management in a 20-year strategic framework in different research, scientific, cultural and educational fields, it has gained a lot of domestic and foreign recognition. Iaukhsh has been seen in some national and international events and has achieved many considerable awards such as Khwarizmi award in 2009, IMAV 2010 and 2011.

Academics

Academic campus 
IAUKHSH campus is one of the largest university campus in the Middle East located in Khomeyni Shahr, Isfahan, occupying about 173 acres (700,000 m2) in the city of Khomeyni Shahr in the pleasant touristic province of Isfahan. The largest academic library of Iran is located on this campus.

Faculties/Colleges 
 Faculty of Law and Economics
 Faculty of Mechanical Engineering
 Faculty of Human Sciences
 Faculty of Engineering|Technology and Engineering
 Faculty of Civil Engineering
 Faculty of Fine Arts|Arts, Architecture and Urban Planning
 Faculty of Electrical Engineering
 Faculty of Computer Engineering
 Sama Technical and Vocational College

Education

Undergraduate Programs Offered 
The IAU, Khomeinishahr branch currently presents 21 undergraduate (B.Sc. & B.A) programs:

Faculty of Law and Economics
 Law 
 Economics
 Accounting

Faculty of Mechanical & Civil Engineering
 Aerospace engineering
 Mechanical engineering (Solid)
 Mechanical engineering (Solid Technology)
 Mechanical engineering (Fluid)
 Mechanical engineering (Fluid Technology)
 Mechanical engineering (Production & Manufacturing)
 Mechanical engineering (Automotive & Installation)
 Mechanical engineering (Automobile Mechanics Technology)
 Mechanical engineering (Cooling & Heating Installations Technology)
 Mechanical engineering (Machine Tools)
 Civil engineering (Civil)

Faculty of Engineering
 Electrical engineering (Power)
 Electrical engineering technology (Power)
 Electrical engineering (Control)
 Electrical engineering technology (Distributing and Transmission Network)
 Computer sciences (Software engineering)
 Computer engineering (Computer Software Technology)
 Biomedical engineering (Bioelectric)
Faculty of Humanities
 Guidance & counseling
 Social work

Graduate Programs Offered 
At present, the IAU, Khomeinishahr branch has 9 graduate (M.Sc. & M.A) programs:

Faculty of Law and Economics
 Law (Family Law & Law and Economics)
 Economic sciences (Economic Planning & Development & E-Commerce)
 Economical and social statistics

Faculty of Mechanical & Civil Engineering
 Mechanical engineering (Energy Conversion)
 Mechanical engineering (Production & Manufacturing)
 Mechanical engineering (Applied Design)
 Mechanical engineering (Mechatronics)
Faculty of Engineering
 Electrical engineering (Power)
 Electrical engineering (Control)
Faculty of Humanities
 Economic sciences (Economic Planning & Development)
 Guidance & counseling
 Economical and social statistics

Clubs & Scientific Associations 
Young researchers’ club was established by the university for young and talented students who pursue academic research. The club provides its members with such facilities as, internet access, recreational and sports equipment, awards, loans, and field trips. Moreover, it provides opportunities for members to take part in academic workshops, scientific researches, and meetings at state and national levels. All scholars between the ages of 15 to 30 may join this club provided that they meet the requirements for admission. Furthermore, a number of scientific associations are active in different research activities. They are as follows:
 Mechanical Engineering Scientific Association
 Aerospace Engineering Scientific Association
 Robotics Scientific Association
 Civil Engineering Scientific Association
 Electrical Engineering Scientific Association
 Computer Engineering Scientific Association
 Artificial Intelligence Scientific Association
 Biomedical Engineering Scientific Association
 Nanotechnology Scientific Association
 Economics Scientific Association
 Guidance and Counseling Scientific Association
 Social Work Scientific Association

Honors

Comptetions 
Though the university website is not updated regularly, this list is mentioned on it:

Inventions 
A number of students' registered inventions with superior ranking in International competitions:

1. Full – automatic dishwasher

2. Microscopic homogenization of surfaces through penetration method

3. Liquid mechanical pump

4. Vehicle side mirror with the capability of vision in several directions

5. Car hood movable from front and back

6. Rubber sclerometer

7. Intelligent anti-lock brake for motorcycle

8. 11-Function carpentry device

9. Wetting device and gas preparatory device for polymetric fuel cell

10. Simple geer designing software

11. Manufacture of electric soldering iron by using graphite energized by 5 to 24 – volt batteries

12. Car and house alarms capable of using coil

13. Electrochemical CU.C.AL battery without ion exchange

14. Mechanical switch torque and high – stroke stimulator of micro – switch

15. Hydroelectric device converting fluid energy to constant energy

16. Air pollutant purification device special for industrial centers

17. Device determining the mass center of inhomogeneous and human non-rigid center

18. Intelligent direction – finder mirrors

19. Full-spinning, ball-bearing crane of columns with two catchers

20. Controlling sleepwalkers by individual relative positioning system

21. Vehicle balance system and prevention from being overturned by pump weights

22. Floating immersed propeller (boat)

23. Design and construction of floating autonomous system (boat)

24. Design and construction of doubled-hull unmanned boat (catamaran) with floating width stabilizer winglets

25. Weakening glass in automobiles

26. Construction of a line following robot

Presence in social networking websites 
The university has an unofficial student Instagram page named "IIAUKHSH" which is managed by a group of students and currently has more than 6500 followers. This group of students also run and manage a Telegram channel name "IIAUKHSH". Both aforementioned page and channels are not confirmed by the university to this day.

The university also had several official Telegram channels, and the most successful ones were run by "education office" and "public affairs", but after telegram censorship in Iran, an order from the central branch of university to halt all branch activities on Telegram and move to national Iranian messengers, these accounts activity were halted (and as of today, 13-Oct-2018 will be deleted in a few weeks due to telegram application automatic account termination after a certain period of inactivity).

See also
Higher education in Iran
List of universities in Iran
List of Universities in Isfahan Province

References

External links 
 Official homepage

1988 establishments in Iran
Khomeynishahr, Islamic Azad University of
Universities in Isfahan Province
Education in Isfahan
Engineering universities and colleges in Iran